Coast Highway may refer to certain segments of the following highways:

 California State Route 1
 Big Sur Coast Highway
 Old Coast Road (Big Sur)
 San Diego County Route S21
 U.S. Route 101
 U.S. Route 101 in California
 U.S. Route 101 in Oregon
 U.S. Route 101 in Washington

See also
 Coast Highway station, Oceanside, California
Pacific Coast Highway (disambiguation)
Pacific Highway (disambiguation)